South Carolina Highway 212 (SC 212) is a  primary state highway in the U.S. state of South Carolina. It serves the town of Williams by connecting it with nearby highways.

Route description
SC 212 is a two-lane rural highway that connects the town of Williams between SC 64 and U.S. Route 21 (US 21). Within Williams, it intersects SC 362 at its eastern terminus.

History
Established around 1938 as a new primary routing as a spur from US 21 to Williams.  In 1940, it was extended south to its current southern terminus at SC 64. In 1950, the entire route was completely paved.

Major intersections

Bells Crossroads connector route

South Carolina Highway 212 Connector (SC 212 Conn.) is a connector route that exists just northwest of Bells Crossroads. It connects SC 64 (Bells Highway) with the SC 212 mainline (Williams Road) just north of SC 212's southern terminus.

See also

References

External links

 
 Mapmikey's South Carolina Highways Page: SC 212

212
Transportation in Colleton County, South Carolina